Emte or EMTE was a Spanish industrial company (EMTA SA). It can also refer to:

EMTÉ, a supermarket chain in the Netherlands
EMTE (Eastern Machinery Trading Establishment), a Jordanian emergency vehicle and Refuse Collection Vehicle company